Wild Wood is the second solo studio album by Paul Weller, released in September 1993. It made it to number 2 on the UK Albums Chart, and contained four UK hits: "Wild Wood", which reached number 14 on the UK charts, "Sunflower", which reached number 16, "The Weaver" which reached number 18 as "The Weaver EP" and "Hung Up", which reached number 11.

In 2000 Q magazine placed it at number 77 in its list of the 100 Greatest British Albums Ever, and it was included in the book 1001 Albums You Must Hear Before You Die.

The original 1993 UK and European CD included 15 tracks. When issued in the US, and reissued in the UK in 1994, a 16th track was added. A two-disc deluxe edition was released on 22 October 2007.

The title track, "Wild Wood", was released as a single in 1993, with "Ends of the Earth" as the B-side. It reached no. 14 on the UK charts in September 1993.

Uncut magazine rated "Wild Wood" as Weller's ninth best ever song and the best of his solo career, with the Smiths' bassist Andy Rourke praising it as a "very easy, kicking-back sort of song".

Track listing

Personnel
Paul Weller – vocals (1–3, 5–7, 9, 10, 12–16), guitars (all the songs), Mellotron (1, 2, 13, 14), synthesizer (1, 4, 11), piano (2, 7, 9, 10, 13, 14), organ (2, 5, 6, 14), bass (2, 5, 14), handclaps (2, 14), percussion (2, 14), electric piano (6), percussion (6), strings (7) and blues harp (6, 9)
Jacko Peake – flute (2, 14), horns (2, 4, 9, 11, 14)
Dee C. Lee – backing vocals (9, 13, 15)
David Liddle – lead guitar (9)
Brendan Lynch – handclaps (2, 14), percussion (2, 14), Mellotron (3, 13), synthesizer (3, 9, 13), Stylophone (7)
Max Beesley – handclaps (2, 14), percussion (2, 14), backing vocals (6), Wurlitzer (15)
Marco Nelson – bass (1, 3, 4, 6, 9, 10, 11, 13, 15), backing vocals (6)
Helen Turner – organ (3)
Steve White – drums (1, 2, 3, 4, 5, 6, 9, 10, 11, 13, 14, 15, 16), percussion (1, 4, 8, 11)
Blow Monkeys – guitars (6, 7)
Steve Cradock – electric guitar (10)
Simon Fowler – backing vocals (10)
Yolanda Charles – bass (16)
Mick Talbot – organ (9)

Charts

Weekly charts

Year-end charts

References

1993 albums
Paul Weller albums
Go! Discs albums